WXBA (88.1 FM, "88 X") is a high school radio station licensed to Brentwood, New York. It broadcasts an oldies radio format and is currently owned by the Brentwood Union Free School District; an integral part of their curriculum. It has been on air since 1975 with the same format. "Anything lower can only be heard by dogs." "The new sound of Long Island. 88-X"

References

External links 

 WXBA page at the Brentwood Union Free School District site

XBA
Mass media in Suffolk County, New York
High school radio stations in the United States
Oldies radio stations in the United States
Radio stations established in 1975
1975 establishments in New York (state)